Miaoli City (Wade–Giles: Miao²-li⁴; Hakka PFS: Mèu-li̍t-sṳ; Hokkien POJ: Biâu-le̍k-chhī or Miâu-le̍k-chhī) is a county-administered city and the county seat of Miaoli County, Taiwan. Miaoli has a relatively high percentage of Hakka people. It had the  second highest residential price and the highest commercial price for land in Miaoli County as of 2004, at NT$28,601 per square meter and NT$63,317 per square meter, respectively.

Etymology
The name Miaoli was coined using two Hakka words, 貓貍, which phonetically approximate Pali (Bari) from the Taokas language.

History

Empire of Japan

Miaoli Hsien was at first eliminated under Japanese rule.  was established in 1901.

Republic of China
On 16 August 1950, Miaoli City (then Miaoli Township) was designed as the county seat of the newly established Miaoli County. On 25 December 1981, Miaoli Township was upgraded from urban township to a county-administered city as Miaoli City.

Population
As of January 2023, the population of Miaoli City was estimated at 86,150.

Administrative divisions

The city is administered as 28 villages: Beimiao, Datong, Fuan, Fuli, Fuxing, Gaomiao, Gongjing, Jiacheng, Jiangong, Jiaxin, Jingmiao, Lumiao, Nanshi, Qinghua, Shangmiao, Shengli, Shuiyuan, Weixiang, Weixin, Wenshan, Wensheng, Xinchuan, Xinmiao, Xinying, Yuhua, Yumiao, Yuqing and Zhongmiao.

Government institutions
 Miaoli County Government
 Miaoli County Council

Education
 National United University

Tourist attractions
 Chiou Chang-hai Commemorative Monument
 Gongweixu Tunnel
 Lai’s Chastity Stone Arch
 Martyr's Commemorative Tower
 Miaoli County Urban Planning Exhibition Center
 Miaoli Craft Park
 Miaoli Mountain Park
 Miaoli Railway Museum
 Miaoli Wenchang Temple
 Thinking Mother Pavilion
 Yuqing Temple

Transportation
Notable bridge in the city is Xindong Bridge.

Rail

 TRA Miaoli Station
 TRA Nanshi Station
Taiwan High Speed Rail cuts through a part of the city, but no station is currently planned.

Bus

Bus services are operated by Miaoli Bus, Hsinchu Bus, and Kuo-Kuang Bus.

Sister city relations
 - Shimizu, Shizuoka Prefecture, Japan.

References

External links